The Canon EOS-1D X is a professional digital SLR camera body by Canon Inc. It succeeded the company's previous flagship Canon EOS-1Ds Mark III and the Canon EOS-1D Mark IV. It was announced on 18 October 2011.

The camera is supplemented by the Canon EOS-1D C, a movie-oriented camera that shares most of its still photographic features with the 1D X. The 1D C was announced in April 2012 and released in March 2013.

In CES (January) 2014, Canon released firmware version 2.0.3 with significant improvements:
 Initial AF point selection and 61-point auto selection AF synchronization
 AF point switching according to camera orientation
 Improved low-light performance
 Expanded minimum shutter speed in auto ISO

On 1 February 2016, Canon introduced the Canon EOS-1D X Mark II as the successor to the EOS-1D X.

Features
The Canon EOS-1D X is an 18.1 effective megapixels full-frame DSLR. The camera is capable of acquiring video at Full HD resolution (1,920 × 1,080 pixels) at frame rates of 24, 25 and 30 fps or 720p (1,280 × 720) at 50 or 60 fps, and SDTV (640 × 480) at 25 or 30 fps. The h.264 video can be switched between all inter frame and IPB with bidirectional prediction to reduce file size. The EOS-1D X has two DIGIC 5+ image processors for sensor reading and compression, and a separate DIGIC 4 dedicated to automatic exposure. It was officially released on 20 June 2012. Like the Canon EOS 5D Mark III and Canon EOS-1D C, the camera features 61 autofocus points, which are assisted by a 100,000-pixel metering sensor.

The camera features an ISO setting range from 50 to 204,800 which can be selected automatically or adjusted manually. Like all Canon DSLR full frame cameras, the 1D X does not feature a built in flash. The camera can shoot 14 frames per second continuous shooting JPEG (with mirror locked up, no autofocus) and 12 frames per second continuous shooting in RAW, JPEG, RAW+JPEG with full auto focus and lens aberration correction. According to Canon, the maximum shooting rate is reduced to 10 fps at ISO settings of 32,000 and higher. The camera's viewfinder has an estimated magnification of .76x and 100% field of view.

The camera can be operated remotely with a Canon WFT-E6A Wireless File Transmitter, allowing an external web enabled device to control the camera. The WFT-E6A Wireless File Transmitter unit also enables Bluetooth v2.1 +EDR, to embed GPS location data into files. The EOS-1D X also features dust and weather resistance. The Canon EOS-1D X and EOS-1D C have four customizable function buttons at the front of the camera, two that can be used for shooting vertically and two for horizontal shooting.

Accessories
According to Canon's website, the EOS-1D X model comes equipped with:
 EOS-1D X Digital SLR Body
 Eyecup E.g.
 Battery Pack LP-E4N
 Battery Charger LC-E4N
 Wide Neck Strap L7
 Cable Protector
 Stereo AV Cable AVC-DC400ST
 USB Interface Cable IFC-200U

Known defects
Canon issued a product advisory indicating that insufficient lubrication within the camera's driving mechanism may lead to excessive wear, potentially causing autofocus to fail and the viewfinder image becoming "blurry" or "not steady". Any bodies sold with the issue are eligible for inspection and repair free of charge. Canon has not issued a recall for selected EOS-1D X and EOS-1D C models that have this issue. Only certain models are affected.

See also
Canon
Canon EOS-1D C

References

External links

Official link

1D X
Cameras introduced in 2012
Full-frame DSLR cameras